The Sishen–Saldanha railway line, also known as the Ore Export Line (OREX), is an  heavy-haul railway line in South Africa. It connects iron ore mines near Sishen in the Northern Cape with the port at Saldanha Bay in the Western Cape. It is used primarily to transport iron ore (60 million tonnes per year) and does not carry passenger traffic.

The Sishen–Saldanha line was built by Iscor, the then iron and steel parastatal, opening in 1976.

In 1977 the line was transferred to Transnet Freight Rail, then known as South African Railways & Harbours, and was electrified. A voltage of 50 kV AC was chosen instead of the usual 25 kV to haul heavier loads and allow greater distance between transformers.

A single-track line with 10 crossing loops to allow trains travelling in opposite directions to pass was constructed. The number of crossing loops has increased to 19 to increase line capacity.

For the next , the line rises and falls before descending towards the Atlantic coast. From there the line follows a coastal route.

Initial train lengths consisted of three class 9E electric locomotives, hauling 210 type CR ore wagons with a payload of 80 tonnes. Upgraded wagons now carry 100 tonnes. Train lengths were increased in 2007 to 342 wagons, employing Radio Distributed Power (RDP) technology. The same 342-wagon trains are now powered by just five 15Es, crewed by one driver and one assistant.

The train length was increased in October 2019 to 375 wagons

See also 
 South African Class 9E, Series 1
 South African Class 9E, Series 2
 South African Class 15E
 South African Class 34-000
 South African Class 34-400
 South African Class 34-500
 South African Class 34-900
 South African Class 43-000

References 

Railway lines in South Africa
Iron ore railways
Mining railways
Mining in South Africa
3 ft 6 in gauge railways in South Africa
Articles containing video clips